Maria Marta of Jesus, born Kazimiera Wołowska, religious name Mother Marta (12 October 1879 - 19 December 1942) was a Polish nun of the Congregation of the Sisters of the Immaculate Conception of the Blessed Virgin Mary who was murdered by the Nazis alongside Bogumiła Noiszewska and Father Adam Sztark for hiding Jews in the convent during World War II. She was beatified in 1999 by Pope John Paul II.

Born on 12 October 1879 to a wealthy devout family, she received a private education. She entered the convent in Jazłowiec when she was 21, and made her perpetual vows on 3 July 1909. As a nun, she conducted charitable work in various cities in Poland. In August 1939 she became the mother superior of the congregation in Słonim, where she helped organize an orphanage and seminary. After the invasion of Poland by Nazi Germany she, fellow nun Bogumiła Noiszewska, and Father  Adam Sztark helped Jews being persecuted by the Nazis hide in the convent. There, she organized clandestine schooling for the people in hiding. She was arrested by the Gestapo on 18 December 1942. When she asked if she could keep her cross, the Nazi officer snatched it from her, threw it on the ground, and kicked her. The next day she was murdered in a massacre of Polish civilians and buried in a mass grave.

See also 
 108 Blessed Polish Martyrs

References 

1879 births
1942 deaths
19th-century Polish Roman Catholic nuns
Polish people executed by Nazi Germany
108 Blessed Polish Martyrs